Hoàng Thúy Toàn (born 1938), often credited as Thuý Toàn, is a Vietnamese writer and literary translator. He was awarded the Order of Friendship by Russian president Dmitry Medvedev in 2010 in recognition of his Vietnamese translations of the poetry of Alexander Pushkin.

Personal life
Toàn was born in Phù Lưu Village, Từ Sơn Town, Bắc Ninh Province, and went abroad for higher education, first to China in 1951 and then to the Soviet Union in 1954. He graduated from the V.I. Lenin Moscow State Pedagogical Institute in 1961.

Career
After his graduation, Toàn returned to Vietnam. He went on to become chairman of the Vietnam Writers' Association's Council on Literary Translation (Hội đồng Dịch thuật Văn học), as well as director of the Center for East-West Cultures and Languages (Trung tâm Văn hóa Ngôn ngữ Đông Tây). Aside from Pushkin, other authors whose works he has translated into Vietnamese include Mikhail Lermontov, Vítězslav Nezval, Sergei Yesenin, and Rasul Gamzatov.

Works

Non-fiction
2002: Những người dịch văn học Việt Nam (with Tử Huyến Đoàn)

Translations
1987: Kịch chọn lọc (with ): selection of Pushkin's plays
2004: Kié̂n và chim bò̂ câu : truyện ngụ ngôn: translation of various short stories by Leo Tolstoy

References

Full citations of authored works:

1938 births
Living people
Russian–Vietnamese translators
People from Bắc Ninh province
Moscow State Pedagogical University alumni